Jeannine Gmelin (born 20 June 1990) is a Swiss competitive rower.

She competed at the 2016 Summer Olympics in Rio de Janeiro, in the women's single sculls, and went on to win the 2017 World Rowing Championships – Women's single sculls.

References

External links

1990 births
Living people
Swiss female rowers
Olympic rowers of Switzerland
Rowers at the 2016 Summer Olympics
Rowers at the 2020 Summer Olympics
World Rowing Championships medalists for Switzerland
European Rowing Championships medalists
People from Uster
Sportspeople from the canton of Zürich
21st-century Swiss women